Collide is a 2022 American thriller film written and directed by Mukunda Michael Dewil and starring Ryan Phillippe, Kat Graham and Jim Gaffigan.

Cast
Ryan Phillippe as Hunter
Kat Graham as Tamira
Jim Gaffigan as Peter
David Cade
Dylan Flashner
Drea de Matteo
Aisha Dee
David James Elliott
Paul Ben-Victor

Production
In January 2022, it was announced that filming wrapped.

Release
The film was released in theaters on August 5, 2022 and on demand on August 12, 2022.

Reception
Monique Jones of Common Sense Media awarded the film three stars out of five.

References

External links